The 2015 Men's Junior Asia Cup was the 8th edition of Men's Hockey Junior Asia Cup. It was held from 14 to 22 November 2015 at the Wisma Belia Hockey Stadium in Kuantan, Malaysia.

India has won the event, beating Pakistan in the Final.

This tournament is a key competition for Asian junior hockey teams, as it serves as a qualifier for the Men's Hockey Junior World Cup held in India in December 2016.

In the last season, held in Ipoh in December 2013, Malaysia won the tournament.

Qualified teams

Results

Preliminary round
Pool matches were played from 14 to 17 November 2015.

Pool A

Pool B

Classification round

Bracket

Quarter-finals
All quarterfinal matches were played on 19 November 2015.

Fifth to eighth place classification

Cross-overs

Seventh and eighth place

Fifth and sixth place

Semi-finals

Third and fourth place

Final

Statistics
All statistics are correct as on 27 November 2015.

Team Goal Scoring

End of Tournament awards

References

External links
2015 Junior Asia Cup: Men

International field hockey competitions hosted by Malaysia
Junior Asia Cup
Hockey Junior Asia Cup Men
Hockey Asia Cup Men
Hockey Junior Asia Cup
Men's Hockey Junior Asia Cup
Asia Cup